The 2016–17 Gibraltar Second Division season was the fourth since the Gibraltar Football Association joined UEFA. This season the league was contested by 9 clubs.

Format
Clubs play each other twice for a total of 16 matches each. The Second Division winner was promoted while the second-placed team entered a playoff with the ninth-placed team from the Premier Division. This season also saw the introduction of a Home Grown Player (HPG) rule, requiring clubs to name 3 home grown players in their matchday squads with at least one of them on the field of play at all times. Gibraltar Phoenix were forced to forfeit their first two games after being found in breach of this new rule, with their 4-1 win over Hound Dogs on the opening week being overturned.

Teams
Europa Point and Mons Calpe were promoted from the Second Division last season. After the 2015–16 Premier Division season, Angels and Britannia XI were relegated. Britannia XI decided to not register for this season. With Pegasus and Red Imps also not competing, the league consisted of nine clubs this season.

League table

Results

Top scorers

See also
2016–17 Gibraltar Premier Division

References

External links
Gibraltar Football Association

Gibraltar Second Division seasons
Gib
1